SS Georgian may refer to:

 , later , scrapped 1924 ;
 , previously named  ;

Ship names